Anderson Whiting was a member of the Wisconsin State Assembly.

Biography
Whiting was born on May 21, 1816. He died on January 2, 1887, and was buried in Waupun, Wisconsin.

His brother, A. Chapin Whiting, was also a member of the Assembly.

Career
Whiting was a member of the Assembly in 1854 and 1860. Originally a Whig, he later became a Republican.

References

External links
 

Wisconsin Whigs
19th-century American politicians
1816 births
1887 deaths
Burials in Wisconsin
Republican Party members of the Wisconsin State Assembly